SIIMA Award for Best Comedian – Telugu is presented by Vibri media group as part of its annual South Indian International Movie Awards, for the best acting done by an actor/actress in a comic role in Telugu films. The award was first given in 2012 for films released in 2011.

Superlatives

Winners

Nominations 

 2011: Brahmanandam – Dookudu
 Ramesh – Ala Modalaindi
 M. S. Narayana – Dookudu
 Srinivasa Reddy – Solo
 Ali – Mirapakay
 2012: Sreenu – Gabbar Singh
 Posani Krishna Murali – Krishnam Vande Jagadgurum
 Bharath – Dhenikaina Ready
 Brahmanandam – Julai
 Ali – Ishq
 2013: Brahmanandam – Baadshah
 Posani Krishna Murali – Naayak
 Vennela Kishore – Doosukeltha
 Saptagiri – Prema Katha Chitram
 Josh Ravi – Gunde Jaari Gallanthayyinde
 2014: Brahmanandam – Race Gurram
 Ali – Oka Laila Kosam
 Prudhvi Raj – Loukyam
 Saptagiri – Kotha Janta
 Vennela Kishore – Pandavulu Pandavulu Thummeda
 2015: Vennela Kishore – Bhale Bhale Magadivoy
 Ali – S/O Satyamurthy
 Brahmanandam – Bruce Lee: The Fighter
 Prudhvi Raj – Bengal Tiger
 Srinivasa Reddy – Pataas
 2016: Priyadarshi – Pelli Choopulu
 Brahmanandam - Sarrainodu
 Krishna Bhagavan – Jayammu Nischayammu Raa
 Prudhvi Raj – Supreme
 Vennela Kishore – Majnu
 2017: Rahul Ramakrishna – Arjun Reddy
 Praveen – Sathamanam Bhavati
 Prudhvi Raj – PSV Garuda Vega
 Shakalaka Shankar – Anando Brahma
 Srinivas Reddy – Anando Brahma / Raja The Great
 2018:Satya – Chalo
 Prudhvi Raj – Sailaja Reddy Alludu
 Sunil – Amar Akbar Anthony
 Vennela Kishore – Chi La Sow
 Vishnu – Taxiwala
 2019: Ajay Ghosh – Raju Gari Gadhi 3
 Priyadarshi & Rahul Ramakrishna – Brochevarevarura
 Abhinav Gomatam – Meeku Maathrame Cheptha
 Vennela Kishore – Chitralahari
 Satya – Mathu Vadalara
2020: Vennela Kishore – Bheeshma
Viva Harsha – Colour Photo
Satya – Solo Brathuke So Better
Sunil – Ala Vaikunthapurramuloo
Saptagiri – Orey Bujjiga
2021: Sudarshan – Ek Mini Katha
 Saptagiri – Varudu Kaavalenu
 Getup Srinu – Zombie Reddy
 Vennela Kishore – Rang De
 Ajay Ghosh – Manchi Rojulochaie

See also 

 Tollywood

References 

South Indian International Movie Awards